Messines may refer to:

 Mesen (in French: Messines), a village in Belgium
Battle of Messines (disambiguation), World War I battles
 Messines, Quebec, a municipality in Canada
 Messines, a village in Portugal
 Messines, Queensland, a settlement in Passchendaele, Australia
 HMCS Messines, one of twelve Battle class naval trawlers used by the Royal Canadian Navy